Ahmed Adghirni (5 May 1947 – 19 October 2020) was a Moroccan Berber politician, lawyer, writer, and human rights activist. He was from a Shilha tribe.

Biography
Adghirni was born in Aït Ali in Sous, Morocco. He was a political activist for Berbers in Morocco. He was very active in the World Amazigh Congress, participating in the "pre-congress" at Saint-Rome-de-Dolan in 1995 and the first congress at Las Palmas in 1997.

Novels
Les larmes de l'orgesse
La ville de la fin

Adghirni also founded two Amazigh magazines: Tamaziɣt and Amzday.

References

1947 births
2020 deaths
Moroccan Berber politicians
20th-century Moroccan lawyers
Moroccan secularists
People from Souss-Massa
21st-century Moroccan lawyers
Shilha people